Manwath Road is a village in Manwath taluka of Parbhani district of Indian state of Maharashtra. Village is mainly known for being a major railway station on Nanded-Aurangabad rail route. Station code of Manwath road is MVO. It is 8 km away from taluka headquarter Manwath.

Demography
As per 2011 census, Manwath road has total 198 families residing. Village has population of 760 of which 385 were males while 375 were females.
Average Sex Ratio of village is 974 which is higher than Maharashtra state average of 929.
Literacy rate of village was 84.19% compared to 82.95% of Maharashtra. Male literacy rate was 93.5% while female literacy rate was 74.3%.
Schedule Caste (SC) constitutes 28.5% while Schedule Tribe (ST) were 8% of total population.

Manwath Road Railway Station

Other Transport
Manwath road is situated on National Highway 222 and well connected to surrounding cities. Following table shows distance of some cities from Manwath road.

See also

 List of railway stations in India

References

Villages in Parbhani district